O Seeta Katha is a 1974 Indian Telugu-language film directed by K. Viswanath. The film won the Nandi Award for Best Feature Film (Silver), and the Filmfare Best Film Award (Telugu). The film was later remade both in Malayalam and Tamil languages as Mattoru Seetha and Moondru Mudichu, respectively. The film was screened at the Asian and African film Festival at Tashkent. C. Ashwani Dutt was Executive Producer for the film.

Plot 
Seeta (Roja Ramani), a teenage girl, lives with her mother and elder sister (Subha), who runs the house with her harikatha performances. Seeta falls in love with Chandram (Chandramohan), but Gopalakrishna (Devadas Kanakala) has an eye on her and hires goons to bash Chandram, who dies on the spot. Seeta marries Madhava Rao (Kantha Rao), father of Gopalakrishna, and makes Gopalakrishna realize his mistakes.

Cast 
Kanta Rao
Chandra Mohan
Roja Ramani
Devadas Kanakala
Allu Ramalingayya
Shubha
Ramaprabha
Pandari Bai

Awards 
Nandi Awards – 1974
Second Best Feature Film – Silver – A.R.S. Sharma

Filmfare Awards South – 1974
 Filmfare Best Director Award (Telugu) – K. Viswanath
 Filmfare Best Film Award (Telugu) – A. R. S. Sarma

Songs 
 "Bhaaratanaarii Charitamu" (harikatha)
 Lyrics: Veturi
 Playback: P. Leela
 "Malle Kannaa Tellana Maa Seeta Sogasu"
 Lyrics: C. Narayana Reddy
 Playback: S. P. Balasubrahmanyam, P. Suseela
 "Puttadi Bomma Maa Pellikoduku"
 Lyrics: C. Narayana Reddy
 Playback: S. P. Balasubrahmanyam, P. Suseela
 "Kallaakapatam Erugani Pillalu Allari Cheste Andam"
 Lyrics: C. Narayana Reddy
 Playback: P. Suseela
 "Ninu Kanna Katha, Mee Amma Katha Vinipinchanaa"
 Lyrics: Veturi
 Playback: B. Vasanta, P. Suseela
 "Chintachiguru Pulupani Cheekatante Nalupani"
 Lyrics: Samudrala
 Playback: S. P. Balasubrahmanyam

References

External links 
O Seeta Katha at IMDB.

1970s Telugu-language films
1974 films
Films directed by K. Viswanath
Telugu films remade in other languages
Films scored by K. V. Mahadevan